Meike Schmelzer (born 10 July 1993) is a German handball player for CS Gloria Bistrița-Năsăud and the German national team.

References

External links

1993 births
Living people
Sportspeople from Wiesbaden
German female handball players
21st-century German women